Indian Tickle, Labrador was located north of Comfort Bight. The Canadian National Railways was established there in 1953. The summer Post Office was established in 1963 and the first Post Master was James Burdett.

See also
 List of communities in Newfoundland and Labrador

Populated places in Labrador